is a city located in the central part of Tottori Prefecture, Japan. , the city had an estimated population of 44,969 in 20609 households and a population density of 170 persons per km².

Geography
The plain supports the agriculture of the region, and is a major center of rice and pears, as well as grapes in the sandy areas near the Sea of Japan coast.

Surrounding municipalities 
Tottori Prefecture
 Hokuei
 Yurihama
 Misasa
 Kōfu
 Kotoura
Okayama Prefecture
 Maniwa

Climate
Kurayoshi has a humid climate (Köppen Cfa) characterized by warm, wet summers and cold winters with heavy snowfall.

Demography
Per Japanese census data, the population of Kurayoshi has been as follows.

History
The area of Kurayoshi was part of ancient Hōki Province, and the Hōki Provincial Capital and Hōki Kokubun-ji were located in this area. The local Ogamo clan dominated the area in the Heian period and into the Kamakura period. In the Muromachi period, Tauchi Castle and Utsubukiyama Castle were built, and the Yamana clan dominated in the area. The current city of Kurayoshi developed from the jōkamachi of Utsubukiyama Castle. After the decline of the Yamana, the area was controlled by the Nanjo clan, who were based in what is now Yurihama. The Nanjo were disposed after the 1600 Battle of Sekigahara, and their territory used by Nakamura Kazutada of Yonago Domain until 1609. In 1614, Satomi Tadayoshi was transferred to Kurayoshi from Tateyama Domain by the Tokugawa shogunate. From 1617, Kurayoshi became part of the holdings of the Ikeda clan at Tottori Domain. From 1632, a senior retainer of the Tottori Domain, the Arao clan, built a jin'ya in Kurayoshi.  During the Edo period, Kurayoshi prospered as the center of commerce and industry.. In the Utsubuki-Tamagawa area (an important preservation district for groups of traditional buildings), traditional buildings, including many 'soil lacquered' warehouses (dozo, 土蔵),  from the late Edo period still remain. Following the Meiji restoration, the town of Kurayoshi was established on October 1, 1889 with the creation of the modern municipalities system. Kurayoshi was raised to city status on October 1, 1953. On March 22, 2005 the town of Sekigane (from Tōhaku District) was merged into Kurayoshi.

Etymology
The name of Kurayoshi in the Japanese language is formed from two kanji characters. The first, means "warehouse", a historical feature of the city, and the second,  means "good" or "good fortune".

Government
Kurayoshi has a mayor-council form of government with a directly elected mayor and a unicameral city council of 17 members. Kurayoshi contributes three members to the Tottori Prefectural Assembly.. In terms of national politics, the city is part of Tottori 2nd district of the lower house of the Diet of Japan.

Economy
The economy of Kurayoshi is primarily agricultural with some light manufacturing.

Education
Kurayoshi has 13 public elementary schools and five public junior high schools operated by the town government. The city has four public high schools operated by the Tottori Prefectural Board of Education and one private high school. The Tottori College of Nursing and Tottori College are also located in Kurayoshi.

Transportation

Railway 
 JR West - San'in Line

Highways

International relations

Kurayoshi is twinned with:
  Matsudo, Chiba, Japan (2004)  
  Naju, South Korea

Local attractions
 Tottori Nijisseiki Pear Museum
 Kurayoshi Park Square, a local development featuring museums, conference rooms, a music hall, restaurants, and park space, remains a popular meeting place.  Nearby Utsubuki park is known throughout the prefecture as one of the best places to view cherry blossoms in spring.  The park also features sports fields and a small animal zoo.

National Historic Sites
Amidaji Kofun Cluster
Sanmyōji Kofun
Ōmidō temple ruins
Ōhara temple ruins
Hōki Kokunbun-ji ruins
Hōki Provincial Capital ruins

Gallery

Noted people from Kurayoshi
Kunihiko Hashida, physician, politician and Minister of Education

References

External links 

 Kurayoshi City official website 

 
Cities in Tottori Prefecture